Guadalix de la Sierra is a municipality of the Community of Madrid, Spain.

According to the 2014 census, the municipality has a population of 6,057 inhabitants.

Landscape

Public transport

Bus 

 197C: Torrelaguna/Venturada - Cabanillas

 726: Navalafuente - Guadalix - Madrid (Plaza de Castilla)

References

External links

 auto

Municipalities in the Community of Madrid